This is a list of flag bearers who have represented Canada at the Olympics.

Opening ceremonies
Flag bearers carry the national flag of their country at the opening ceremony of the Olympic Games.

Closing ceremonies

Flag bearers carry the national flag of their country at the closing ceremony of the Olympic Games.

See also
Canada at the Olympics

Footnotes

References

Flag bearers
Canada
 Flag bearers